The first general elections in the history of the Ottoman Empire were held in 1877.

Background

Provisional Electoral Regulations were issued on 29 October 1876, stating that the elected members of the Provincial Administrative Councils would elect members to the first Parliament of the Ottoman Empire. On 24 December a new constitution was promulgated, which provided for a bicameral Parliament with a Senate appointed by the Sultan and a popularly elected Chamber of Deputies.

Only men above the age of 30 who were competent in Ottoman Turkish and had full civil rights were allowed to stand for election. Reasons for disqualification included holding dual citizenship, being employed by a foreign government, being bankrupt, employed as a servant, or having "notoriety for ill deeds".

Aftermath
Parliament convened on 19 March 1877 and adjourned on 28 June. Fresh elections were held later in the year for a new Parliament that convened in December.

References

1877 elections in Asia
1877 elections in Europe
Elections in the Ottoman Empire
1877 in the Ottoman Empire